Anatragoides exigua is a species of beetle in the family Cerambycidae. It was described by Hermann Julius Kolbe in 1893. It is known from Angola and the Democratic Republic of the Congo.

References

Sternotomini
Beetles described in 1893
Taxa named by Hermann Julius Kolbe